Allan Edward Moss  (born 1949) is an Australian businessman, who was the Managing Director/CEO of Macquarie Group Ltd. Moss retired from Macquarie Group in May 2008 after 31 years, including a 15-year stint as the CEO. Prior to this Moss was a director of Hill Samuel Australia and led the team responsible for preparing the submission to the Australian Government to form Macquarie Bank in 1983. He held various positions within Macquarie Bank before becoming Managing Director/CEO in 1993. He had been a director of the company since 1989.

From 2015 to 2020, Moss served as one of the nine members of the Board of the Reserve Bank of Australia.

Moss is the Principal of Allan Moss Investments Pty Ltd, a family investment company.

He is married to former public servant and lawyer Irene Moss.

References

1949 births
Living people
Harvard Business School alumni
Sydney Law School alumni
Australian chief executives
Officers of the Order of Australia